Stole Popov (born 1950) is a Macedonian film director.

Biography
He was born 20 August 1950 in Skopje, Yugoslavia. He graduated film directing at the Academy of Theatre, Film & Television in Belgrade. He is currently a film directing professor at the Faculty of Dramatic Arts in Skopje and chief of Film Directing Studies. Also, he is a member of the European Film Academy since 1997. Stole Popov has won over 50 high European and World Awards and significant recognitions.

Films

 Fire
 (documentary) – 1974

 Gold Medal – Yugoslav Film Festival, Belgrade;  Grand Prix – Tuzla, Bosnia
  Yugoslav candidate for Oscar Nomination

 Australia, Australia
 (documentary feature film) – 1976

 Grand Prix – Gold Medal – Yugoslav Film Festival, Belgrade
 Yugoslav candidate for Oscar Nomination

 Dae
  (documentary) – 1979

 OSCAR Nomination in 1979, American Film Academy
 Grand Prix – World Film Festival, Oberhausen, Germany
 Grand Prix – Balkan Film Festival- Ljubljana,Slovenia
 Silver Boomerang – Melburn, Australia
 Gold Medal – Yugoslav Film Festival, Belgrade
 Special Dioloma – London, England

 The Red Horse
 (feature film) 1980

 Macedonian Nacional Award, Skopje;  International Film Guide ’83 – Best World Selection – London
 Film on the Balkans – Anthology of 24 films, Dina Jordanova, London
 Farewell Yugoslavia – Viennale ’93, Anthology of 33 films, Vienna

 Happy New '49
  (feature film) – 1986

 Grand Prix – Golden Arena at the Yugoslav Film Festival - Pula, Croatia
 Grand Prix – Porto Alegre, Brasil;  Milton Manaki - Critics Award
 Golden Gladiator – Award of the Yugoslav Film Academy
 Yugoslav candidate for Oscar Nomination  
 Anthology of Middle European Film – Sasa Petrovic, FEST Belgrade
 Farewell Yugoslavia – Viennale ’93, Anthology of 33 films, Vienna
 Grand Prix – Yugoslav Actors Film Festival – Nis

 Tattoo
 (feature film) – 1992

 FELIX Nomination in 1992 - European Film Academy  
 Grand Prix – Yugoslav Film Festival, Herceg Novi, Montenegro
 Grand Prix – Yugoslav Actors Film Festival, Nis
 Macedonian candidate for Oscar Nomination
 Farewell Yugoslavia – Viennale, 93 Anthology of 33 films, Vienna

 Gypsy Magic
  (feature film) – 1997

 Grand Prix – Antigone d’Or- Mediterranean Film Festival, Montpellier, France;   
 Jury Award – International Film Festival, Izmir, Turkey
 Best Selection 1997 – European Film Academy, Berlin

 To the Hilt
  (feature film) – 2014

Videos

Skopje
Skopje Leb i sol – music video, 1987
Grand Prix – Yugoslav Video Festival, Belgrade

Gipsy song
 Gipsy song Vlatko Stefanovski – music video, 1998
Best Macedonian Music Video – Skopje

References

External links
 Home link by Stole Popov
 Macedonian Cinema Information Center

1950 births
Living people
Film people from Skopje
Macedonian film directors
University of Belgrade Faculty of Dramatic Arts alumni